Lotito is a surname. Notable people with the surname include:

Claudio Lotito (born 1957), Italian entrepreneur
Frank Lotito (born 1971), Australian actor, comedian, film director, and film producer
Lawrence Lotito (1921–2004), American business owner, meteorologist, and Air Force officer
Michel Lotito (1950–2007), French entertainer